Cognitive reserve is the mind's and brain's resistance to  damage of the brain. The mind's resilience is evaluated behaviorally, whereas the neuropathological damage is evaluated histologically, although damage may be estimated using blood-based markers and imaging methods. There are two models that can be used when exploring the concept of "reserve": brain reserve and cognitive reserve. These terms, albeit often used interchangeably in the literature, provide a useful way of discussing the models. Using a computer analogy brain reserve can be seen as hardware and cognitive reserve as software. All these factors are currently believed to contribute to global reserve. Cognitive reserve is commonly used to refer to both brain and cognitive reserves in the literature.

In 1988 a study published in Annals of Neurology reporting findings from post-mortem examinations on 137 elderly persons unexpectedly revealed that there was a discrepancy between the degree of Alzheimer's disease neuropathology and the clinical manifestations of the disease: some participants whose brains had extensive Alzheimer's disease pathology, had no or very few clinical manifestations of the disease. Furthermore, the study showed that these persons had higher brain weights and greater number of neurons as compared to age-matched controls. The investigators speculated with two possible explanations for this phenomenon: these people may have had incipient Alzheimer's disease but somehow avoided the loss of large numbers of neurons, or alternatively, started with larger brains and more neurons and thus might be said to have had a greater "reserve". This is the first time this term has been used in the literature in this context.

The study sparked off interest in this area, and to try to confirm these initial findings further studies were done. Higher reserve was found to provide a greater threshold before clinical deficit appears. Furthermore, those with higher capacity once they become clinically impaired show more rapid decline, probably indicating a failure of all compensatory systems and strategies put in place by the individual with greater reserve to cope with the increasing neuropathological damage.

Brain reserve
Brain reserve may be defined as the brain's resilience, its ability to cope with increasing damage while still functioning adequately. This passive, threshold model presumes the existence of a fixed cut-off which, once reached, would inevitably herald the emergence of the clinical manifestations of dementia.

Brain size

A 1997 study found that Alzheimer's disease pathology in large brains did not necessarily result in clinical dementia. Another study reported head circumference to be independently associated with a reduced risk of clinical Alzheimer's disease.

While some studies, like those mentioned, find an association, others do not. This is thought to be because head circumference and other approximations are indirect measures.

Number of neuronal connections
The amount of synapse loss is greater in early onset dementia than in late onset dementia. This might indicate a vulnerability to the manifestation of clinical cognitive impairment, although there may be other explanations.

Structures like the cerebellum contribute to brain reserve. The cerebellum contains the majority of neurons in the brain and participates to both cognitive and motor operations. Cerebellar circuitry is a site of multiple forms of neuronal plasticity, a factor playing a major role in terms of brain reserve.

Genetic component of cognitive reserve
Evidence from a twin study indicates a genetic contribution to cognitive functions. Heritability estimates have been found to be high for general cognitive functions but low for memory itself. Adjusting for the effects of education 79% of executive function can be explained by genetic contribution. A study combining twin and adoption studies found all cognitive functions to be heritable. Speed of processing had the highest heritability in this particular study.

Cognitive reserve
Cognitive reserve also indicates a resilience to neuropathological damage, but the emphasis here is in the way the brain uses its damaged resources. It could be defined as the ability to optimize or maximize performance through differential recruitment of brain networks and/or alternative cognitive strategies. This is an efficiency model, rather than a threshold model, and it implies that the task is processed using less resources or using neural resources more efficiently, resulting in better cognitive performance. Studies use factors like education, occupation, and lifestyle as proxies for cognitive reserve because they tend to positively correlate with higher cognitive reserve.

Education and occupation
More education and cognitively complex occupation are some of the factors that predict higher cognitive abilities in old age. Therefore, two most commonly used proxies to study cognitive reserve are education and occupation. Education is known to play a role in cognitive decline in normal aging, as well as in degenerative diseases or traumatic brain injuries. A higher prevalence of dementia in individuals with fewer years of education has suggested that education may protect against Alzheimer's disease. Moreover, the level of education has a strong impact on adult's lifestyle. Level of education is measured by the number of years an individual spends in school or alternatively, the degree of literacy. Possibly, the level of education itself provides a set of cognitive tools that allow the individual to compensate for the pathological changes. Cognitive Reserve Index Questionnaire (CRIq), devised to assess the level of cognitive reserve in order to provide better diagnosis and treatment, takes into account years of education and possible training courses lasting at least six months to assess the education load on cognitive reserve. Clinically, education is negatively correlated with dementia severity, but positively correlated with grey matter atrophy, intracranial volume, and overall global cognition. Neurologically, education is correlated to greater functional connectivity between fronto-parietal regions and greater cortical thickness in the left inferior temporal gyrus. In addition to the level of education, it has been shown that bilingualism enhances attention and cognitive control in both children and older adults and delays the onset of dementia. It allows the brain to better tolerate the underlying pathologies and can be considered as a protective factor contributing positively to the cognitive reserve. Another proxy for cognitive reserve is the occupation. Studies suggest that occupation may provide additive and independent source of cognitive reserve throughout person's life. The last or the longest job is usually taken into account. Occupation values may vary in terms of cognitive load involved. Some other common indices, such as prestige or salary can also be considered. Working activity measured by CRIq assesses adulthood professions. There are five different levels of working activities available, differing in the degree of intellectual involvement and personal responsibility. Working activity was recorded as the number of years in each profession over the lifespan. Occupation as a proxy for cognitive reserve is positively correlated with local efficiency and functional connectivity in the right medial temporal lobe. More cognitively stimulating occupations are weakly associated with greater memory, but are more strongly correlated with greater executive functioning. These two proxies are typically measured together and are typically highly correlated with each other. A genetic study using Mendelian randomization analysis demonstrated that high occupation levels were associated with reduced risk for Alzheimer’s disease. In addition, this study confirmed that occupational attainment had an independent effect on the risk for Alzheimer’s disease even after taking educational attainment into account.

Lifestyle
For any given level of clinical impairment, there is a higher degree of neuropathological change in the brains of those Alzheimer's disease sufferers who are involved in greater number of activities. This is true even when education and IQ are controlled for. This suggests that differences in lifestyle may increase cognitive reserve by making the individual more resilient. In other words, everyday experience affect cognition analog to physical exercise influencing musculoskeletal and cardiovascular functions. Using cerebral blood flow as an indirect measure of neuropathological damage, lower CBF indicating more damage, it was found that at a given level of clinical impairment leisure activity score was negatively correlated with CBF. In other words, individuals with greater activity score were able to withstand more brain damage and therefore can be said to have more reserve. Mortimer et al. performed cognitive testing on a population of 678 nuns in 1997, in which they showed that different levels of cognitive activity and performance were possible in patients diagnosed with Alzheimer's. One subject showing reduced neocortical plaques survived with mild deficits, despite (or due to) low brain weight.

Lifestyle factors 
More recent studies distinguish four modifiable lifestyle factors which influence cognitive health in later life and offer potential to reduce the risk of cognitive decline and dementia. Between 2011 and 2013 the Cognitive Function and Aging Study Wales (CFAS-Wales) collected data from a cohort of 2,315 cognitively healthy participants aged 65 years and over, not only confirming the theory of impacting lifestyle factors but also detecting a mediating effect of cognitive reserve on the cross-sectional association between lifestyle factors and cognitive function in later life.

Findings 
Cognitive and social activity: People with high leisure activity of intellectual (reading magazines or newspapers or books, playing cards, games or bingo, going to classes etc.), social (visiting or being visited by friends or relatives, etc.), engaging (helping others with daily tasks, paid work and volunteer work) nature have a significant smaller risk of developing dementia.

Physical activity: Has a strong impact on developing cognitive decline or dementia.

Healthy diet: Research on healthy diets emphasizes the benefits of adhering to the Mediterranean-style diet as protection of cognitive health.

Alcohol consumption: Studies suggest that light-to-moderate alcohol intake is associated with lower risk (once or twice a week or three or four times a week), as were frequent drinking in earlier life is identified as a risk factor for cognitive decline in later life.

Due to the variety of the four lifestyle factors, a lot of different self-report-scales are used to specify the severity of each proxy.

Parkinson's disease 
Parkinson's disease is an example for a condition which is associated with the role of cognitive reserve and cognitive impairment. Previous investigation into Parkinson's disease implicated a possible influence of cognitive reserve in the human brain.

According to some studies the so-called Cognitive Lifestyle is seen as a general protective factor that can be mediated though several different mechanisms.

A study from 2015 included the effects of (cognitive) lifestyle on cross-sectional and longitudinal measures. 525 participants with Parkinson’s disease completed different baseline assessments of cognition and provided clinical, social and demographic data. After 4 years 323 participated in a cognition assessment in the follow-up. The researchers therefore used the measures of global cognition dementia severity. It has been shown, that next to the educational level and the socio-economic status a higher level of recent social engagement was also associated with a decreased risk of dementia.  On the other hand, increasing age and low levels of social engagement may increase the risk of dementia in Parkinson’s disease.

Global reserve
In spite of the differences in approach between the models of brain reserve and cognitive reserve, there is evidence that both might be interdependent and related. This is where the computer analogy ends, as with the brain it seems that hardware can be changed by software.

Neurotrophic effect of knowledge
Exposure to an enriched environment, defined as a combination of more opportunities for physical activity, learning and social interaction, may produce structural and functional changes in the brain and influence the rate of neurogenesis in adult and senescent animal model hippocampi. Many of these changes can be effected merely by introducing a physical exercise regimen rather than requiring cognitive activity per se.

In humans, the posterior hippocampi of licensed London taxi drivers was famously found to be larger than that of matched controls, while the anterior hippocampi were smaller. This study shows that people choosing taxi driving as a career (one which has as a barrier to entry—the ability to memorize London's streets—described as "the world's most demanding test (of street knowledge)") have larger hippocampi, but does not demonstrate change in volume as a result of driving. Similarly, while acquiring a second language requires extensive and sustained cognitive activity, it does not appear to reduce dementia risk compared to those who have not learned another language, although lifelong bilingualism is associated with delayed onset of Alzheimer's disease.

Clinical implications
The clinical diagnosis of dementia is not perfectly linked to levels of underlying neuropathology. The severity of pathologies and the deficit in cognitive performance could not have direct relationship. The theory of cognitive reserve explains this phenomenon. Katzman et al. (1998) conducted a study on the autopsy results of 10 people and found a pathology related to Alzheimer's disease. However, the same patients showed no symptoms of Alzheimer's disease during their life time. So, when pathology emerges in the brain, cognitive reserve helps to cope with cognitive decline. Thus, individuals with high cognitive reserve cope better than those with low cognitive reserve even if they have the same pathology. This causes people with high cognitive reserve to go un-diagnosed until damage becomes severe.

Cognitive reserve, which can be estimated clinically, is affected by many variables. The Cognitive Reserve Index questionnaire (CRIq) measures cognitive reserve under three main sources, namely the education, work activities and leisure time activities throughout the individual's lifespan.

It is important to note that cognitive reserve (and the variables associated with it) do not "protect" from Alzheimer's disease as a disease process—the definition of cognitive reserve is based exactly on the presence of disease pathology. This means that the traditional idea that education protects from Alzheimer's disease is false, albeit that cognitive reserve is protective of the clinical manifestations of disease. As of 2010, there was insufficient evidence to recommend any way to increase cognitive reserve to prevent dementia or Alzheimer's. On the other hand, cognitive reserve has a very important impact on neurodegenerative diseases. Patients with high cognitive reserve showed a delay in cognitive decline when compared to patients with low cognitive reserve. However, when the symptoms of cognitive decline become symptomatic, patients with high cognitive reserve show rapid cognitive decline.

The presence of cognitive reserve implies that people with greater reserve who already are suffering neuropathological changes in the brain will not be picked up by standard clinical cognitive testing. Conversely anyone who has used these instruments clinically knows that they can yield false positives in people with very low reserve. From this point of view the concept of "adequate level of challenge" easily emerges. Conceivably one could measure cognitive reserve and then offer specifically tailored tests that would pose enough level of challenge to accurately detect early cognitive impairment both in individuals with high and low reserve. This has implications for treatment and care.

In people with high reserve, deterioration occurs rapidly once the threshold is reached. In these individuals and their careers early diagnosis might provide an opportunity to plan future care and to adjust to the diagnosis while they are still able to make decisions. A cognitive rehabilitation study, conducted with dementia patients, showed that patients with low cognitive reserve had better outcomes from cognitive training rehabilitation when compared to high cognitive reserve. This is due to the fact that the patients with high cognitive reserve had delayed cognitive symptoms and therefore the disease could no longer resist the pathology. Furthermore, the improvement seen in the patients with low cognitive reserve indicates that these patients can build their cognitive reserve as a life-long process.

References 

Neurology
Geriatric psychiatry